Logba Adzekoe is a town in the Volta Region of Ghana. The town is known for the Jim Bourton Memorial Agriculture Secondary.  The school is a second cycle institution. Matilda Amissah-Arthur has been installed as a queen mother of Logba-Adzakoe in 2016.

References

Populated places in the Volta Region